Before 1963, the English rugby team never had a test series and in 1963 they played in a two test series. So here is a list of test series involving the England rugby union team.

1963 Series – New Zealand

1971 Series – Japan

1971 Series – Ceylon

1975 Series – Australia

1979 Series – Japan

1981 Series – Argentina

1984 Series – South Africa

1985 Series – New Zealand

1988 Series – Australia

1990 Series – Argentina

1993 Series – Canada

1994 Series – South Africa

1997 Series – Argentina

1997 Series – New Zealand

1998 Series – New Zealand

2000 Series – South Africa

2001 Series – Canada

2003 Series – France

2004 Series – New Zealand

2006 Series – Australia

2006 Series – South Africa

2007 Series – South Africa

2007 Series – France

2008 Series – New Zealand

2009 Series – Argentina

2010 Series – Australia

2011 Series – Wales

2012 Series – South Africa

2013 Series – Argentina

2014 Series – New Zealand

2015 Series – France

2016 Series – Australia

2017 Series – Argentina

2018 Series – South Africa

Test Series Scores

Touring Test Series

Home Test Series

Home and Away Test Series

2009 Argentina
First Test	37–15	6 June	Old Trafford, Manchester
Second Test	22–24	13 June	Estadio Padre Ernesto Martearena, Salta

2011 Wales
First Test	23–19	6 August	Twickenham, London
Second Test	9–19	13 August	Millennium Stadium, Cardiff

2015 France
First Test	19–14	15 August	Twickenham, London
Second Test	20–25	22 August	Stade de France, Paris

Notes 

       
Test Series